Acacia hakeoides, known colloquially as hakea wattle, is a species of Acacia native to southern Australia. It can be found growing in sandy soils in semiarid and Eucalyptus woodland in the region.

References

hakeoides
Fabales of Australia
Flora of New South Wales
Flora of Queensland
Flora of South Australia
Flora of Victoria (Australia)
Acacias of Western Australia